"Stay With Me Tonight" is a song recorded by Albanian singer and songwriter Eugent Bushpepa. Lasting three minutes and fifty four seconds, the song was written and produced by the singer himself. The official music video for the song was shot in Italy directed by Renuar Locaj (video/photographer) and was uploaded on 12 February 2020 onto YouTube in order to accompany the single's release. It features scenes with the singer and Albanian model Adrola Dushi focusing on the singer's relationship with his girlfriend.

Background and composition 

"Stay With Me Tonight" has a duration time of three minutes and fifty four seconds and was solely written and produced by Eugent Bushpepa himself. In terms of music notation, it was composed in  time and is performed in the key of E major with a tempo of 135 beats per minute. It is his first single in over two years after Mall with whom he participated at the Eurovision Song Contest 2018. Lyrically, the song delves on themes of losing the love, choices that can be made in difficult situations in order to move forward.

Music video 

The accompanying music video was directed by Renuar Locaj and premiered onto the official YouTube channel of Eugent Bushpepa prior to the digital release on 12 February 2020. The clip was filmed during winter in various locations in the city of Rome, Italy, Directed by Renuar Locaj and features the guest appearance from Albanian model Adrola Dushi. It was released on digital platforms and to streaming services as a single on 21 February 2020.

Track listing 

Digital download
"Stay with Me Tonight"3:54

Charts

Release history

References 

2020 songs
2020 singles
English-language Albanian songs
Eugent Bushpepa songs